In astronomical photometry, the Ultraviolet and Optical Telescope (UVOT) on the Neil Gehrels Swift Observatory observes astronomical objects in its 17-by-17 arc minute field of view through one of several filters or grisms.  The seven filters, which are similar to those on the XMM-Newton-OM (Optical Monitor) instrument, cover the near-ultraviolet and optical range.  The brightness of an object observed in the three optical filters, called u, b, and v, can be converted into the more common Johnson-Morgan (see the UBV photometric system) magnitudes. 
The three ultraviolet filters probe a spectral region that is not observable from the ground.

Although the main mission is to chase gamma-ray bursts as soon as they occur, many other transient celestial sources and other objects in the field of view are being measured.

The filters, not being like any other photometric system in use from the ground or in space, give unique photometric measurements. Their response has been defined as the UVOT photometric system, as outlined by T. S. Poole et al.

See also

Stellar classification

References

Photometric systems

ms:Sistem fotometrik UBV
ja:\u30b8\u30e7\u30f3\u30bd\u30f3\u306eUBV\u30b7\u30b9\u30c6\u30e0
pt:Sistema fotométrico UBV
sk:UBV systém
zh:UBV\u6d4b\u5149\u7cfb\u7edf